is a Japanese professional baseball outfielder. He was born on March 28, 1991. He is currently playing for the Chunichi Dragons of the NPB. He previously played for the Chiba Lotte Marines.

References

1991 births
Chunichi Dragons players
Living people
Baseball people from Saitama Prefecture
Jobu University alumni
Japanese baseball players
Nippon Professional Baseball outfielders
Chiba Lotte Marines players